José Arias (27 August 1922 – 7 January 2015) was a Spanish alpine skier who competed in the 1948 Winter Olympics.

References

1922 births
2015 deaths
Spanish male alpine skiers
Olympic alpine skiers of Spain
Alpine skiers at the 1948 Winter Olympics
Sportspeople from Madrid
20th-century Spanish people